The Bongka River is a river in Central Sulawesi, Indonesia, about 1700 km northeast of capital Jakarta

Geography 
The river flows in the central area of Sulawesi island with predominantly tropical rainforest climate (designated as Af in the Köppen-Geiger climate classification). The annual average temperature in the area is 23 °C. The warmest month is October, when the average temperature is around 24 °C, and the coldest is April, at 22 °C. The average annual rainfall is 2929 mm. The wettest month is April, with an average of 341 mm rainfall, and the driest is September, with 79 mm rainfall.

See also
List of rivers of Indonesia
List of rivers of Sulawesi

References

Rivers of Central Sulawesi
Rivers of Indonesia